The 1886 Princeton Tigers football team represented Princeton University in the 1886 college football season. The team finished with a 7–0–1 record and was retroactively named as the national champion by the Billingsley Report and as a co-national champion by Parke H. Davis.

On Thanksgiving Day in Princeton, New Jersey, undefeated teams from Yale and Princeton met. The game started late due to the absence of a referee, and heavy rain caused the game to be called on account of darkness with Yale leading 4–0 in the second half. Under the rules of the time, the game was declared "no contest" by the substitute referee, and the final score was declared to be 0–0. After a special meeting of the Intercollegiate Football Association held to review the game, the Association issued a two-part resolution: that (1) Yale should have been acknowledged the winner, but that (2) under their existing rules, the Association did not have the authority to award the game to them.

Schedule

References

Princeton
Princeton Tigers football seasons
College football national champions
College football undefeated seasons
Princeton Tigers football